Propustularia is a genus of sea snails, marine gastropod mollusks in the subfamily Erosariinae of the family Cypraeidae, the cowries.

Species
Species within the genus Propustularia include:
 † Propustularia renardi Dolin, 1998
Propustularia surinamensis (Perry, 1811)

References

 Schilder, F.A. (1927). Revision der Cypraeacea (Moll. Gastr.). Archiv für Naturgeschichte. 91A(10): 1-171.
 Meyer C. 2003. Molecular systematics of cowries (Gastropoda: Cypraeidae) and diversification patterns in the tropics. Biological Journal of the Linnean Society, 79: 401-459
 Lorenz, F. (2017). Cowries. A guide to the gastropod family Cypraeidae. Volume 1, Biology and systematics. Harxheim: ConchBooks. 644 pp. page(s): 211

External links
 Oppenheim P. (1901). Die Priabonaschichten und ihre Fauna im Zusammenhange mit gleichalterigen und analogen Ablagerungen. Palaeontographica. 47: 1-348, 33 figs, 21 pls
 Coomans, H. E. (1963). Systematics and distribution of Siphocypraea mus and Propustularia surinamensis (Gastropoda: Cypraeidae). Studies on the Fauna of Curaçao and other Caribbean Islands: no. 68. 15(1): 51-71

Cypraeidae
Monotypic gastropod genera